Nina Compton is a James Beard award winning Saint Lucian chef currently living in New Orleans, Louisiana.

Career

Nina graduated from the Culinary Institute of America in Hyde Park. She began her professional journey at Daniel in New York City, working and continuing her culinary education alongside world renowned chef/restaurateur Daniel Boulud and his team.

After moving to Miami, she continued to work with the best, joining the crews of Norman Van Aken at the original/iconic Norman’s then Philippe Ruiz at Palme d’Or at the historic Biltmore Hotel. Eventually Nina moved to Casa Casuarina, a private club and boutique hotel in Miami Beach where she rose from Sous Chef to Executive Chef of the small yet highly acclaimed property.

With the excitement of the 2008 reopening of the refurbished Fontainebleau Miami Beach, combined with the chance to work with Scott Conant at Scarpetta, Nina leapt at the chance to join the pre-opening team as Sous Chef and went on to be appointed Chef de Cuisine, where she earned raves and accolades.

Compton competed on Season 11 of Top Chef. She was the Top Chef, Season 11 runner up and was voted fan favorite by viewers.

In June 2015, Compton opened her own restaurant in New Orleans, Louisiana, Compère Lapin. Compère Lapin serves Caribbean-style cuisine and is located in the New Orleans Central Business District.

In March 2018, Compton opened Bywater American Bistro in New Orleans with Husband/Partner Larry Miller and Chef/Partner Levi Rains.

Awards 
In 2017, Compton was honored with the "Best New Chef" award in Food & Wine magazine. Her restaurant Compère Lapin was named one of America's 38 Best Restaurants by Eater in 2017.

In 2018, Compton won the James Beard Foundation award for Best Chef: South.

Personal life

Compton is married to Larry Miller. She is the daughter of Sir John George Melvin Compton, who served as Prime Minister of Saint Lucia on three occasions.

References 

Top Chef contestants
American women restaurateurs
American restaurateurs
1978 births
Living people
Saint Lucian emigrants to the United States
American chefs
American women chefs
Naturalized citizens of the United States
James Beard Foundation Award winners
People from New Orleans
21st-century American women
Culinary Institute of America Hyde Park alumni